Charlotte Caroline Wilhelmine Bachmann, née Stöwe (2 November 1757 – 19 August 1817) was a German soprano singer, harpsichordist and composer. She was born in Berlin, the daughter of musician Wilhelm Heinrich Stöwe, and studied singing and harpsichord as a child. She married Berlin violist Karl Ludwig Bachmann on 20 September 1785.

She was one of twenty founding members of the Berlin Singakademie in 1791, and was instrumental in establishing annual performances of C. H. Graun’s Der Tod Jesu between 1797 and 1806, a tradition that continued at the Berlin court until 1884. She was well regarded as a performer in Berlin. One of her songs was published in Rellstab's Clavier-Magazin in 1787. She died in Berlin.

Works
Bachman composed songs. Selected works include:
"", 1787

References

1757 births
1817 deaths
18th-century classical composers
19th-century classical composers
Women classical composers
German classical composers
German sopranos
19th-century German composers
18th-century German composers
19th-century women composers
18th-century women composers